Malope is a genus of three species in the mallow botanical family (Malvaceae).  Of the three species, Malope trifida is often used as an ornamental plant.

Species
Malope anatolica 
Malope trifida 
Malope malacoides

References

Malveae
Malvaceae genera